Ole Tøpholm (born 9 October 1977 in Silkeborg) is a Danish radio host.

Tøpholm graduated in 2002 at Journalisthøjskolen with a journalism degree. Since 2000 he has been working for the Danish broadcaster Danmarks Radio as a reporter on Radioavisen and he is currently the morning news presenter for DR P3.

Tøpholm was the regular Danish Commentator of the Eurovision Song Contest between 2011 and 2019 contests. A devoted fan since childhood, he was chairman of the Danish Eurovision fan club. He published a book Dansk Melodi Grand Prix – De største øjeblikke, devoted to The Dansk Melodi Grand Prix.

References

1977 births
People from Silkeborg
Living people
Danish radio presenters
Denmark in the Eurovision Song Contest